Gerald Grosvenor is the name of:

Gerald Grosvenor, 4th Duke of Westminster (1907–1967)
Gerald Grosvenor, 6th Duke of Westminster (1951–2016)